The Adams Block, at 123 Main St. in Three Forks, Montana, was built in 1918.  It is an Early Commercial-style building.  It was listed on the National Register of Historic Places in 1999.

It is a two-story  brick building which was declared to be "'one of the most modem stores in the state of Montana' upon its completion in 1918."

References

National Register of Historic Places in Gallatin County, Montana
Early Commercial architecture in the United States
Buildings and structures completed in 1918
1918 establishments in Montana
Commercial buildings on the National Register of Historic Places in Montana
Three Forks, Montana